In mathematics, specifically in order theory and functional analysis, a band in a vector lattice  is a subspace  of  that is solid and such that for all  such that  exists in  we have  
A band generated by a singleton set is called a principal band.

Examples 

If  is the usual space of real valued functions used to define Lp spaces  then  is countably order complete (that is, each subset that is bounded above has a supremum) but in general is not order complete. 
If  is the vector subspace of all -null functions then  is a solid subset of  that is  a band.

Properties 

The intersection of an arbitrary family of bands in a vector lattice  is a band in

See also

References

  
  

Functional analysis